"Main Man" is a rock song by American singer-actress Cher from her eighteenth studio album, Cher. It was written and produced by Desmond Child. 
It was released as a single from the album in 1988 by Geffen.

It had originally been recorded by Desmond Child & Rouge in 1978.

Song information
"Main Man" was released as a promo CD in the United States and as a commercial 7" inch single. In 1988 in order to promote the song, a music video was filmed and Cher sang "Main Man" during the MTV Video Music Awards. After consideration, Geffen Records decided not to officially release the song.

Critical reception
Jose F. Promis of Allmusic retrospectively highlighted the song and called it "wonderfully sweet ballad."

Music video 
A music video was made in which Cher roams around her then empty mansion which at the time she was selling to comedian Eddie Murphy. The video also featured clips of Cher while singing the song at the MTV music awards. Rob Camiletti, Cher's boyfriend at the time, also appears in the video.

Track listing
US 7" and cassette single
"Main Man" – 3:48
"(It's Been) Hard Enough Getting Over You" – 3:48

References

External links
Official Cher site

1980s ballads
Cher songs
Songs written by Desmond Child
Pop ballads